Pular grammar is the set of structural rules that govern the Pular language, one of the Fula languages of the Niger-Congo language family spoken in West Africa. It is complicated and varies from region to region. This may explain why it is virtually impossible to find literature that teaches advanced topics in Pular grammar. The following explanation concerns mainly the Pular language spoken in Futa Jallon. To facilitate learning, all expressions are translated into English.

Nouns, pronouns and adjectives

Nouns and their articles
Since the articles of nouns vary significantly, it is better to learn each Pular noun with its appropriate articles. It is also useful to learn the plural and singular forms of Pular nouns together because no simple rules are apparent for going from the singular form to the plural form, however, a few generalizations can be made.
 Pular nouns don't have indefinite articles. So the "a" article in English is simply omitted in Pular. Example: a hand = jungo .
 The most common, definite articles associated with plural nouns are:  ɓen (which is reserved for nouns indicating many people), ɗin, and ɗen. The latter two articles are used for nouns referring to objects or things.   ɓen,  ɗin, and   ɗen correspond to "the" in English.
  on is the singular form of ɓen, and is used for nouns that indicate a single person.
 Nouns imported from other languages, especially French, follow some systematic patterns. In the singular form of the noun, the definite article is on (there are some situations where other articles can work as well, but the on article seems to work all the time). If the noun indicates an object or a thing, the plural form of the noun is usually created by adding 𞤶𞤭 ji at the end of the singular form, and ɗin is used as the article for the plural form. If the imported noun indicates a person, the singular form of the noun will end with jo, but the plural form will end with ɓe, and ɓen is used as the article for the plural form.

The plural articles ɓen, ɗin, and ɗen correspond to ɓe, ɗi, and ɗe in other varieties of Fula, respectively. Pular pronunciation tends to nasalize these words, which is represented by the trailing letter "n."

Please see the tables below for examples that demonstrate these systematic patterns.

Singular and plural forms of imported nouns

Plural and singular forms of most fruits and vegetables
The nouns of most fruits and vegetables follow a similar pattern when changing from singular to plural. These nouns have a root form, which perhaps was imported from other languages. The singular form of these nouns is created by adding  re to the root, and  nden is usually the definitive article. By contrast, the plural form is obtained by adding  je to the root, and  ɗen is the definitive article for the plural form. The table below provides examples to demonstrate this pattern.

Singular and plural forms of other nouns

Possessive adjectives

Note that "jungo" can be used for all when it means "responsibility". Example: No e jungo amen = "it is in our responsibility," or "we are in change." Men acci e jungo mon = "We leave it to you."
Also, unlike in English, the possessive adjective comes after the noun in Pular. In the table above, "jungo" is a noun that means hand. Similar to English, the possessive adjective does not vary with the genre or number of what is possessed. It varies only with the noun that possesses. For example:
 ɓeyngu an (my wife) --> moodi an (my husband). Note here that the genre of the noun changed, but the possessive adjective stayed the same (an).
 jungo an (my hand) --> juuɗe an (my hands). Note here that the noun changed from singular to plural, but the possessive adjective stayed the same (an).

The singular possessive in Pular – an – corresponds exactly with the am used in other varieties of Fula. Again, the pronunciation is more nasalized in Pular.

Object pronouns
lan, ma, te, mo, men, en, on, ɓe.

Interrogative keywords
ko hombo, ko honɗun, ko homɓe, ko honno, ko honto, ko ... honɗi, ko ... njelo, ko ... jelu

Subject pronouns
mi, a, o, men, en, on, ɓe, ɗe, ɗi

Demonstrative adjectives
Pular has many demonstrative adjectives, which are keywords that indicate the location of a "noun" with respect to the speaker. However, they are usually derived from the definitive articles described above. Here is a partial list:

oo, ɓee (plural = these people), ɗii(plural), ɗee(plural), [ngal, ngol, ngii, ngoo, nguu, nduu, ndee, ndii, ɗan, mbaa, kun, etc...]
The English equivalent of these adjective demonstratives are: this, these, that, and those.

Indefinite pronouns
Note that this is a partial list.
 goɗɗo, goɗɗun, hay e gooto, hay e fus

See the table below for some expressions using indefinite pronouns.

Others__location
ɗoo, gaa, ɗaa, too, gaɗa, gaanin

Verb forms and conjugations

Various verb types
Pular verbs – like those in other varieties of Fula (with the exception of Adamawa) – fall into one of three "voices": active, middle, and passive. Infinitives in Pular are formed with -gol rather than -de as in other varieties of Fula. The endings are:
 Active: -ugol
 Middle: -agol
 Passive: -egol

Verbal extensions (sometimes dubbed "infixes") can be added between the root and the (active) verb ending to change meaning. Examples of verb endings with this adfixes include: angol, ingol, orgol and others. Please see the table below for examples.

Affirmative forms of verbs:

The future form of various verb types
1) Active voice verbs (ending in "ugol"): To express the affirmative form of ugol verbs in the future, simply replace the ugol ending with ay. For example, soodugol turns into sooday. Note that the verb does not vary with the subject. The table below provides more examples using the verb "soodugol", which means to buy.

Although the verb does not vary with the subject, it does vary with the object. That is when the object is the singular form of you, the "ay" ending becomes "e". The table below shows some examples of how the future form of "ugol" verbs varies with the object.

Verbs with "infixes" (ending in "angol", "ingol" or "orgol"): To express the affirmative form of these verbs in the future, simply replace the gol ending with ay. For example, jangangol turns into janganay; yaggingol into yagginay; and okkorgol into okkoray. Similar to above, the verb does not vary when the subject varies.

2) Middle voice verbs (ending in "agol"): To express the affirmative form of agol verbs in the future, simply replace the agol ending with oto. For example, fubbagol turns into fubboto. Note that the verb does not vary with the subject. The table below provides more examples using the verb "fubbagol", which means to swim.

3) Passive voice verbs (ending in "egol"): To express the affirmative form of egol verbs in the future, simply replace the egol ending with ete. For example, weelegolturns into weelete. Note however that this form does not always make sense if the subject is I (mi). For example, "mi sokete" sounds more like "I will have you jailed" than "I will be jailed". The table below provides more examples using the verb "weelegol", which means to be hungry.

The imperative form of various verb types

1) Verbs ending in -ugol makes either -u 2nd pers. sing. or -en 1st pers. plur. or -ee 2nd pers. plur.

okkugol: to give makes Okku : Give; Okken: Let us give and Okkee: Let you give

2) Verbs ending in -agol makes either -o 2nd pers. sing. or -oɗen 1st pers. plur. or -ee 2nd pers. plur.

Jooɗagol: to sit makes Jooɗo gaa : Sit here ; Jooɗoɗen : Let us sit ; Jooɗee : Let you sit.

3) Verbs ending in -egol do not have an imperative forms though an imperative construction is possible.

Rules when the verb has an infix:

The present continuous form of various verb types

The past continuous form of various verb types

The terminated past form of various verb types
1) Verbs ending in "ugol": To express the affirmative form of ugol verbs in the "terminated past" form, simply replace the ugol ending with uno. For example, soodugol turns into sooduno. Note that the verb does not vary with the subject. The table below provides more examples using the verb "soodugol".

Here are some simple sentences where "ugol" verbs are conjugated in the Terminated Past form.

Although the verb does not vary with the subject, it does vary with the object. That is when the object is either me or you (singular), the "ugol" verb can vary. The table below shows some examples of how the Terminated Past form of "ugol" verbs varies with the object. The chosen verb is "wallugol", which means to help.

2) Verbs ending in "agol": To express the affirmative form of agol verbs in the "terminated past" form, simply replace the agol ending with ino. For example, jooɗagol turns into jooɗino. Note that the verb does not vary with the subject. The table below provides more examples using the verb "immgagol", which means to get up.

Here are some simple sentences where "agol" verbs are conjugated in the Terminated Past form.

3) 7Verbs ending in "egol": To express the affirmative form of egol verbs in the "terminated past" form, simply replace the egol ending with ano. For example, lamminegol turns into lamminano. Note that the verb does not vary with the subject. The table below provides more examples using the verb "weelegol", which means to be (get) hungry.

Here are some simple sentences where "egol" verbs are conjugated in the Terminated Past form.

The simple past form of various verb types
1) Verbs ending in "ugol": To express the affirmative form of ugol verbs in the "simple past" form, simply replace the ugol ending with ii. For example, soodugol turns into soodii. Note that the verb does not vary with the subject. The table below provides more examples using the verb "ɲaamugol", which means to eat.

Here are some simple sentences where "ugol" verbs are conjugated in the Simple Past form.

2) Verbs ending in "agol": To express the affirmative form of agol verbs in the "simple past" form, simply replace the agol ending with ike. For example, jooɗagol turns into jooɗike. Note that the verb does not vary with the subject. The table below provides more examples using the verb "immgagol", which means to get up.

Here are some simple sentences where "agol" verbs are conjugated in the Simple Past form.

3) Verbs ending in "egol": To express the affirmative form of egol verbs in the "simple past" form, simply replace the egol ending with aama. For example, lamminegol turns into lamminaama. Note that the verb does not vary with the subject. The table below provides more examples using the verb "weelegol", which means to be (get) hungry.

Here are some simple sentences where "egol" verbs are conjugated in the Simple Past form.

The past participle form of various verb types
1) Verbs ending in "ugol": To express the affirmative form of ugol verbs in the "past participle" form, simply replace the ugol ending with i. For example, nawnugol turns into nawni. Note that the past participle form of the verb behaves as an adjective and is preceded by the verb to be conjugated in the present. The table below provides more examples using the verb "ronkugol", which means to be tired.

Here are some simple sentences where "ugol" verbs are converted to the Past Participle form and used as adjectives.

2) Verbs ending in "agol": To express the affirmative form of agol verbs in the "simple past" form, simply replace the agol ending with ike. For example, jooɗagol turns into jooɗike. Note that the verb does not vary with the subject. The table below provides more examples using the verb "immgagol", which means to get up.

Here are some simple sentences where "agol" verbs are conjugated in the Simple Past form.

3) Verbs ending in "egol": To express the affirmative form of egol verbs in the "simple past" form, simply replace the egol ending with aama. For example, lamminegol turns into lamminaama. Note that the verb does not vary with the subject. The table below provides more examples using the verb "weelegol", which means to be (get) hungry.

Here are some simple sentences where "egol" verbs are conjugated in the Simple Past form.

Negative forms of verbs:

The future, negative form of various verb types
1) Verbs ending in "ugol": To express the negative form of ugol verbs in the future, simply replace the ugol ending with ataa. For example, soodugol turns into soodataa. Note that the verb does not vary with the subject. The table below provides more examples using the verb "soodugol", which means to buy.

2) Verbs ending in "agol": To express the negative form of agol verbs in the future, simply replace the agol ending with ataako. For example, fubbagol turns into fubbataako. Note that the verb does not vary with the subject. The table below provides more examples using the verb "fubbagol", which means to swim.

3) Verbs ending in "egol": To express the negative form of egol verbs in the future, simply replace the egol ending with ataake. For example, janfegol turns into fubbataake. Note that the verb does not vary with the subject. The table below provides more examples using the verb "janfegol", which means to be cheated.

Negation of the imperative form of various verb types

Negation of the present continuous form of various verb types

Negation of the past continuous form of various verb types

Negation of the Terminated Past form of various verb types

Negation of the Simple Past form of various verb types

Negation of the past participle form of various verb types

Interrogative forms of verbs

Adjectives and adverbs
The word "very" in English takes many different forms in Pular depending on what adjective is being emphasized. Here are a few examples:
 kaani kas means very ugly.
 laaɓi pos means very clean.
 woɗɗi pon means very far.
 raɓɓiɗi pot means very short.
However, in general, most of these Pular adverbs could be replaced with moƴƴa to emphasize the adjective. But the style would be lost. The table below contains additional examples with their appropriate adverbs.

Sentence structure

Making Comparisons
 Comparing with "ɓuri"

 Comparing with "wa"
 Comparing with "fotta"

Contrasting ideas
 Expressing contrasting ideas with "kono" (which means but)

Cause and effect
 Expressing cause with "ɓayru"

Time clauses
 Expressing time clauses with "tuma"

 Expressing time clauses with "haa"

 Expressing time clauses with "tuma woo"
 Expressing time clauses with "fewndo"

Relative clauses
Relative clauses in Pular are often used to give more details about a noun or an idea within a sentence. Thus they play a similar role in English. They are often associated with the following relative pronouns:
 ɗo = who (singular). This pronoun usually comes after a conjugated verb. Ex: ... gorko nawnu ɗo. = ... a man who is sick.
 mo = who (singular). Unlike ɗo, mo usually comes after a noun. Ex: ... gorko mo nawnaa. ... a man who is not sick.
 ɓe = who (plural)
 wondema = that
 ɗi, ɗe, ko, ɗan, ngal, etc... = that
 mo/ɓe/ɗi/ɗe ... mun = whose. This is a partial list since these pronouns are related to the definitive articles of the nouns.

Please see the table below for examples that demonstrate the use of relative clauses.

Conditional clauses
 Expressing conditional clauses with "si"

References

External links
 
 http://pular.webonary.org

Niger-Congo grammars
Fula language